Lost Dorsai is a science fiction novella by American writer Gordon R. Dickson. It won the Hugo Award for Best Novella in 1981 and was also nominated for the Nebula Award in 1980.

Plot summary
A few highly skilled mercenaries, the Dorsai, are stuck defending a powerless ruler whose army has revolted. To make matters worse, one of their members, the military band leader, refuses to kill. He finds a way to save his comrades, using the machismo permeating the culture of the world they are on, though the price is high.

Reception
Susan Shwartz reviewed Lost Dorsai in Ares Magazine #4 and commented that "Dickson has packed an amazing amount of human pain into Lost Dorsai. It is an intense novella, and very finely crafted; each major character is drawn into each other character's pain."

Dave Langford reviewed Lost Dorsai for White Dwarf #57, and stated that "From the surprisingly satisfying resolution, which turns the enemies' machismo judo-style against them, I suspect Dickson has been reading Kipling again."

Sources, references, external links, quotations

References

1980 short stories
Short stories by Gordon R. Dickson
Hugo Award for Best Novella winning works
Ace Books books